Fire-Lite Alarms is an American company owned by Honeywell and based in Northford, Connecticut. Fire-Lite manufactures fire alarm control panels (FACPs), EVAC (emergency voice and alarm communicator) panels, manual pull stations, digital alarm communicators, and annunciators.

Fire-Lite was founded in 1952 by Edward Levy, along with his son, Herbert. At the time, the company installed and serviced fire alarm systems. However, Levy began to focus on designing his own components, and in 1962, the company stopped installing and servicing systems. By 1973, the company had grown substantially, and moved into a new  building. Fire-Lite was the first company to introduce a compact, inexpensive addressable fire alarm control panel. Some of their recognizable products include the Fire-Lite BG-10 pull station, introduced in 1983, and the newer BG-12 pull station, introduced in 1999. Fire-Lite is part of the Honeywell Life Safety Group, along with Notifier.

See also
 Notifier
 System Sensor
 Fire alarm system

References

External links
 Fire-Lite Alarms
 Honeywell

Electronics companies of the United States
Fire detection and alarm companies
Companies based in New Haven County, Connecticut
Electronics companies established in 1952
Honeywell
1952 establishments in Connecticut